The Trentino-Alto Adige/Südtirol regional election of 1983 took place on 20 November 1983.

The weakened Christian Democracy continued the alliance with the South Tyrolean People's Party.

Results

Regional Council

Source: Trentino-Alto Adige/Südtirol Region

Province of Trento

Source: Trentino-Alto Adige/Südtirol Region

Province of Bolzano

Source: Trentino-Alto Adige/Südtirol Region 

Elections in Trentino-Alto Adige/Südtirol
1983 elections in Italy